Rowland Ellis (1650 – September 1731) was a Welsh Quaker leader.

He was the owner of the farm of Bryn Mawr near Dolgellau.  He became a Quaker, along with a number of other inhabitants of Dolgellau, after a visit to the town by George Fox in 1657.  As a result of religious persecution, he and others emigrated to Pennsylvania in 1686.  The town of Bryn Mawr there is named after Ellis's farm.  In 1688 he briefly returned to Wales to set his affairs in order, but went back to Pennsylvania, where in 1700 he was elected to represent Philadelphia in the provincial assembly.

In 1969 Marion Eames, a Welsh writer who lived in Dolgellau, published a semi-fictional account of the events leading up to the emigration under the title Y Stafell Ddirgel, since translated into English as "The Secret Room".

References

1650 births
1731 deaths
Converts to Quakerism
Members of the Pennsylvania Provincial Assembly
Welsh Quakers
Welsh emigrants to the United States